Lakia, Lakistan (Lak: Lak, Lakral kanu, Lakku bilayat, Lakkuy) is the name of the ethnic territory of the Laks in Dagestan in the North Caucasus of Eastern Europe. Kumukh is the main historical, cultural, spiritual and political center of Lakia that consists of Lakskiy and Kulinskiy districts.

Territory

Geographical location
Lakia is bordered to the north and west by Avaria, to the east by Dargo (occasionally called Darginstan or Darganstan), and to the south by Agul and Rutul. On the other side of the Caucasus lie Georgia and Azerbaijan (including the historical kingdom of the Tsakhurs).

Lakia represents itself as a triangle with slightly rounded sides, facing its apex to the north and the base to the south. The apex of this triangle is the gorge of Tsudakhar. The sides of this triangle are the so-called cross-ridges of the Caucasian mountains. The east side includes the Karinsko-Kundi mountains, Ali mountain, Shunudag, and Kulinsko-Khosrekh ridge. Western side of the plateau includes Turchidag, Shali ridge, and Archavarsky ridge. The base of the triangle includes Dultidag and Kukminski mountains.

Settlements
In Laksky and Kulinsky Districts there are about 90 Lak villages, most of which are located within the specified triangle, representing the pool of Kazikumukh Koisu and its tributary Kulinka river. This basin is cut by various tributaries of major rivers, over which rise the mountains and ridges of smaller sizes. Rivers tend to fill the entire bottom of the bed and steep slopes, hanging over them, allowing only narrow footpaths. Between the ranges of the mountains stretch alpine plateaus, whose average level is 1400–2000 meters. There are little forests in Lakia. Most likely they were cut down to increase the area of grazing land for livestock.

History

Antiquity
The Laks have long lived in the mountains of Dagestan. According to M. Kurbiev there was in Kumukh a fortress built in the 4th century by Lak king. Traces of this fortress could be seen in the ruins: "these are baring in some places walls of stone fortress, three meters thick, over which a cart can pass freely, the remnants of three, circular in form, huge towers at the top of the foundations of the northern part of the settlement". The state of the Laks or the Lak state (in Lak lang.), may be one of the oldest in Dagestan.

Armenian historian Vardapet Yeghishe reported that in the 5th century 11 kings of mountains waged a war against the Sassanian Iran. It is known that the conquerors sought to subordinate the existing political power centers and one of such centers was Kumukh in the mountainous Dagestan, that had political importance for the Sassanids. The chronicle reported that the ruler of Persia Khosrow I Anushirvan captured Kumukh and "appointed [there] a ruler" and that "the rulers of Kumuk were from  the family of Nushirwan". In the 6th century the dynasty of rulers of Kumukh was related to the royal family of Anushirvan. In the 6th-7th centuries the rulers of Persia were allied with the rulers of the mountainous Dagestan, against the Khazars. V. V. Bartold wrote that the Sassanids blocked with fortifications not only the Derbent passage, but the neighboring mountainous valleys as well, while the rulers of the mountains became part of the Persian nobility and received from the Sassanids titles and ranks.

Middle Ages
An important milestone in the history of the Laks was the coming of Arabs to Dagestan. After prolonged Arab invasions in the eighth  century Lakia was ruled by shamkhal, the appointee of Arabs. Kumukh was one of the centers of Arab influence in Dagestan. In 778 a cathedral mosque was built in Kumukh. Bahadur Gamzatovich Malachihanov wrote that "Kumukh was the biggest stage in the great ancient pass of the people, as such, drawing attention to itself must have been, at the very early period of Arab conquests in the Caucasus, the subject of fierce Islamic expansion directed to the north". In 1240 Kumukh was invaded by the Mongolo-Tatars. At the end of the 13th century the rulers of Kumukh accepted Islam. In the 14th century the state of shamkhal became the leading political and military power in Dagestan.

In the 15th century with the decline of Golden Horde's influence in the North Caucasus, shamkhal of Gazi-Kumukh asserted his authority in the northern Dagestan and in the south opposed the territorial expansion  of Iran, Shirvan and Georgia. In the 16th century the ruler of Gazi-Kumukh was named with the Iranian title padishah. In the 17th century anti-shamkhalate coalition, that included Iran, Russia and Turkey, sought to diminish the authority of the ruler of Gazi-Kumukh. In 1642 the title shamkhal passed from Gazi-Kumukh to the branch of shamkhals in Tarki.

Modern era
Alibek II formed the Gazikumukh Khanate. Lakia was divided into six districts or principalities such as "Machimi", "Vitskhi", "Gumuchi", "Kullal", "Uri-Mukarki" and "Bartki". The "qat" of Gazi-Kumukh was in authority. In 1710 Surkhay-khan I consolidated Lakia into a unified state and formed a regular army. By 1725 Surkhay-khan I became the ruler of Shirvan. In 1820 Lakia became part of Russia. Laks are also present in Pakistan. Their population is nearly one hundred thousand in Pakistan, and there are several members of provincial and national assembly.

Rulers

Shamkhals
Shakhbal ibn Abdullah (740), Badr I (1295-1304), Akhsuvar I (14th century), Surkhay I (16th century), Umal-Muhammad I (1551), Budai I ibn Umal-Muhammad (1566-1567), Surkhay I ibn Umal-Muhammad (1567-1569), Chopan ibn Budai (1569-157), Surkhay II ibn Chopan (1605-1614), Andia ibn Chopan (1614-1623), Eldar ibn Surkhay (1623-1635), Aidemir ibn Sultan Mahmud (1635-1640).

Khans
Alibek II ibn Tuchilav (1642-1700), Surkhay ibn Garai-Bek (1700-1741), Murtazali ibn Surkhay (1741-1743), Muhammad ibn Surkhay (1743-1789), Surkhay ibn Muhammad (1789-1820), Aslan ibn Shakhmardan (1820-1836), Nutsal-Aga ibn Aslan (1836-1836), Muhammad-Mirza ibn Aslan (1836-1838), Ummu Kulsum-Beke (1838-1841), Abdurrahman ibn Umar (1841-1847), Aglar ibn Umar (1847-1859), Jafar ibn Aglar (1877-1877).

Secular education

Schools
In 1861 a secular school was opened in Kumukh, which taught Russian language and basic arithmetic. In October 1912, two male rural schools in Unchukatl and Kaya were opened, where 27 and 50 students studied respectively. A year later one-class male school in Tsovkra and Kurkli were opened. The school in Kumukh was transformed into a higher primary school. The most prominent representative of educational trends in Dagestan in the early 19th century was Sayed Gabiev of Kumukh who later became one of the leaders of Dagestan. Madrasa schools developed parallel to the secular schools. In 1913 there were about 40 of them in Gazi-Kumukh District.

In 1967 a children's music school started in Kumukh. Its first director was Abakarova Zinaida, the graduate of Makhachkala music college. The school in Kumukh taught to play piano and folk instruments. In 1990 the department of choreography was opened in the school and worked for 6 years. In 1996 the school was named after the prominent Lak singer Maryam Dandamaeva. In 2003 the music school was reorganized into the School of Arts that started to function as jewelry and choreography department. Kumukh choreographic ensemble "Ozornie devchata" represented the District in such television shows as "Rainbow-bow", "Stars of Dagestan", "Quail" and in the annual contest "Shamil Sabre" for several years held the 1st place. In 2006 the ensemble won the award of the "Schunudag" festival and a third degree diploma of the national competition "My home — native Dagestan". In 2008 in the 5th International Competition of Young Performers in Sochi city, ensemble took second place.

Native tongue
Literary language began to take shape among the Laks already in the 15th century. At the beginning of the 18th century there were translated from Persian and Arabic into Lak a number of works as historical chronicle "Derbent-Nameh" and a medical treatise "Hannal Murad" (Khan's Desire). Education of children in Lak literacy in Kumukh was made possible by the tireless work of P. K. Uslar on compiling the Lak ABC, released in 1865. The first lecturer of Lak language was a student and a friend of P. K. Uslar, a native of the Kurkli village Abdullah Omar. P. Uslar wrote that A. Omar — "is a young man, very talented and hardworking, with whom I could freely communicate in Russian. Now he writes in his own language without the slightest difficulty and learned grammatical understanding of it. On him rests the hope for distribution of literature among Laks".

Under Soviet rule Lak language received the status of the literary and was assigned the functions of teaching and learning. Lak language successfully functioned as a language of instruction in elementary and high schools, colleges and universities. There were written textbooks in Lak Language by G.-G. Gitinaev, Ali Kayaev, G. .B Murkelinski (later the first Doctor of Philology and Sciences in the North Caucasus), etc. Haroun Saidov (writer of the postrevolutionary era, b. in Vachi village in 1891, shot by the Denikin bandits in Kumukh in 1919) founded the Lak newspaper "Ilchi", was the author of several poetry and prose articles and the first social drama in the Lak language — "Kalaychital". He has written a collection of poems such as "The Sounds Lak chungury" (1927) and the novel "The people". Lak  poets of the post-October period (1917) were Ahmed Karadi, Zak-Zade (Kurdi), Khalil Ibrahim, Eid Aliyev, Abakar Mudunov and Magomed Bashaev. Gadis Hajiyev and Mueddin (Murad) Charin translated to Lak some works of Pushkin, Lermontov, Heine, Shakespeare, etc.

Culture

Craft
The culture of the Laks is rich in folklore and handicrafts that originate in the mists of time, as well as modern traditions. Archaeological data suggest the presence of metalworking in Kumukh and surrounding areas since the mid-1st millennium BC.

The art of working with precious metals artisanally was found among many peoples of the Caucasus and in no lesser degree among Laks. For example, in the Gazikumukh district 55 villages out of 100 engaged in the processing of gold and silver. Many Lak towns as Kumukh, Hurukra, Unchukatl, Kai Kurkli, Nitsovkra, Duchi, Chitur, Churtah, Chara, etc. were jewelry centers. Researchers distinguished Kumukh (Gazi-Kumukh) for the most elegant examples exhibit and high skills in the decoration of various products with silver, gold, ivory and enamel. Lak gunsmiths were considered among the best in the Caucasus with famous families as Chargada (17th-18th century), Akiyev (18th century) Guzunov (17th-19th, early 20th century) and Malla-Umarov (17th-20th century). In 1886 the Gazi-Kumukh county had 608 master silversmiths and 276 blacksmiths.

Theater
In Lak State Music and Drama Theatre named after E. Kapiev operates in Dagestan and dates back to the amateur circle of Lak intellectuals of Kumukh that opened in 1914. In 1920 the theater was named Soviet theater of Said Gabiev. In the early 1935 by the decision Provincial Committee of the CPSU (b) and the CPC of the Dagestan ASSR, the Lak Drama Theatre of E. Kapiev, was opened. The founders of the theater were I. Balugov, A. Dzhalalov, A. Aliev, Gunashev, G. Buganov, H. Sultanov, A. Huseynov and  M. Ramazanov. In 2001 the play "Party-Patima" by  M. Aliyev won the Republican State Award in Theatrical Arts of G. Tsadasa (directed by Efendiyev). In 2004 the  Ministry of Culture of RF and the Ministry of Culture of RD awarded the Lak Theatre with the Festival Diploma "Poetic theater of Dagestan", for the genre enrichment of theatrical art of Dagestan  — the staging of the musical "The Wheel of Life". Among popular shows in Lakia are the old Lak song "Shaza of Kurkli", amateur art dedicated to "Part-Patima" and festival of "Shunudag". Activities are recorded on video and shown on local television channel "Lakia" and sometimes on the Dagestani television.

Monuments
Krinski and Vareyski rock paintings, ruins of ancient settlements, old stone buildings. In total Lak district has 114 monuments of history, culture and architecture. Among them 40 monuments are of architecture and 1 of monumental art. In Kumukh there is an ancient underground water conveyance system, shamkhal and yemeni cemetery, tombstone stele of Murtazali-Khan. In the village of Chukna there is old house of Suleyman Chupalov, who at the beginning of the 19th century was the chief judge of Dagestan, and met with Tsar Nicholas II in Derbent, a house of poet Shazy Kurklinskaya from Kurkli village. Among the fortresses that exist in the capital of Lakia, the bastion built on a hill of Kumukh named Gurd (Gurd-bakIu) attracts the attention. In this bastion lived the rulers of Kazi-Kumukh. From the name "Gurd" came the name of ancient Lak weapon "Gurda-tur".

Celebrations
In 2002 Lak District celebrated its 80-year anniversary. The celebration was attended by First Deputy Prime Minister of RD Mukhtar Majidov, pilot-cosmonaut, Hero of the Soviet Union and the State Duma deputy Musa Manarov, Chairman of the NBRD Bank of Russia Sirazhudinov Ilyasov, heads of administrations of cities and districts of Dagestan and many others, famous singers of Lak songs were also invited. To give congratulations on the anniversary came a delegation of Agul District, headed by Yuri Ismailov. Head of MO "Lak District" Yusup Magomedov said: "Lakia — a unique formation in the central part of mountainous Dagestan". In the National Library named after R. Gamzatov, there was presentation of the book "Lakia" by Musanip Uvaysov. The presentation was attended by intellectuals, scholars and prominent figures of culture, art, science and education of Dagestan.

See also
 History of Lakia
 Shamkhalate of Kazi-Kumukh
 Khanate of Kazi-Kumukh
 Dagestan
 History of Dagestan

References

Populated places in Dagestan
Geography of Dagestan
Laks (Caucasus)